Vitória Futebol Clube Is a professional handball team based in Setúbal, Portugal. It plays in LPA.
 
	 

Portuguese handball clubs
Vitória F.C.